Copelatus fulviceps is a species of diving beetle. It is part of the genus Copelatus in the subfamily Copelatinae of the family Dytiscidae. It was described by J. Balfour-Browne in 1938.

References

fulviceps
Beetles described in 1938